Thommas Rønning (born 16 July 1985 in Trondheim) is a Norwegian professional football player. He is a central midfielder who currently plays for Ranheim Fotball. He moved there in 2012 after having played for FK Bodø/Glimt.

He is the brother of female football player Trine Rønning who plays for Stabæk Fotball.

Career statistics

External links
Bodø/Glimt website 

1985 births
Living people
Norwegian footballers
Association football midfielders
Strindheim IL players
FK Bodø/Glimt players
Ranheim Fotball players
Eliteserien players
Norwegian First Division players
Footballers from Trondheim